Ferdinand Peper (born 1961)  is a Dutch theoretical computer scientist.

Peper obtained his PhD at the Delft University of Technology in 1989 with the thesis Efficient network topologies for extensible massively parallel computers. He currently is working in a senior research position at Kobe Advanced ICT Research Center, and the National Institute of Information and Communications Technology. He is best known for his research on Nanocomputing, Asynchronous systems, Cellular automaton, Reconfigurable hardware and Instantaneous Noise-based logic. His research goals are to develop next-generation computing and communication architectures and also schemes enhanced by Nanotechnology and Nanoelectronics including single-electron transistors. Particular topics of his research include the reduction of energy requirement, the exploitation of noise and fluctuations for informatics,
and the features of molecular self-organization and self-assembly. He was the Chair of the Fourth International Workshop on Natural Computing (2009) and acted as a co-editor of the book Natural Computing (Springer). He is a member of editorial board of the International Journal of Unconventional Computing.

Most cited papers
 Peper F, Lee J, Adachi S, et al., "Laying out circuits on asynchronous cellular arrays: a step towards feasible nanocomputers?", Nanotechnology 14 (2003) 469-485.
 Peper F, Lee J, Abo F, et al., "Fault-tolerance in nanocomputers: A cellular array approach", IEEE Trans. Nanotechnology 3 (2004) 187-201.
 Adachi S, Peper F, Lee J, "Computation by asynchronously updating cellular automata", J. Stat. Phys. 114 (2004) 261-289.
 Peper F, Isokawa T, Kouda N, et al., "Self-timed cellular automata and their computational ability", Future Generation Computer Systems 18 (2002) 893-904.

See also
 Asynchronous circuit
 Natural computing
 Unconventional computing
 Noise-based logic

References

External links
 List of publications on the DBLP server
 Noise-based logic homepage

1961 births
Living people
Dutch computer scientists
Theoretical computer scientists
Delft University of Technology alumni
People from Hengelo